Keith Harrington is an Irish hurler who plays with Kerry, South Kerry and Kilgarvan.

References

Kerry inter-county hurlers
Kilgarvan hurlers
Kilgervan Gaelic footballers
Living people
Year of birth missing (living people)